The Middle East Broadcasting Networks (MBN) is a U.S.-government-funded American Arabic-language non-profit media organization broadcasting news and information across the Middle East and North Africa region.

MBN comprises two television networks, (Alhurra and Alhurra-Iraq), Radio Sawa, and several digital properties (Alhurra.com, RadioSawa.com, Irfaasawtak.com, MaghrebVoices.com, and Elsaha.com). MBN is financed by the U.S. government through a grant from the U.S. Agency for Global Media (USAGM), an independent federal agency that serves as a firewall to protect journalists from political influence. Including MBN, there are four other networks under the USAGM umbrella: Voice of America (VOA), Radio Free Europe/Radio Liberty, Radio y Television Marti, and Radio Free Asia.  Former U.S. diplomat, Ambassador Alberto Fernandez was appointed as head of MBN in 2017.  On November 4, 2018, MBN relaunched and introduced innovative new programming across all platforms.

MBN's mission in to provide accurate and objective information on the MENA region, American policies and Americana, as well as in-depth analysis focusing on topics not found in other Arab media outlets to encourage transparency and democracy. After airing an investigative report alleging corruption within Iraq's Sunni and Shiite religious establishments, Iraqi authorities suspended the license of MBN's Alhurra television channel for three months.

History and funding 
The purpose of launching MBN and its networks was to counter perceived anti-American bias promoted by the leading Arab and international television networks and the effect these channels were having on Arab public opinion regarding the U.S. MBN and its networks are intended to serve as an alternative to these channels by presenting the news in a more balanced and objective manner in an effort to improve the image of the United States in the Arab world.

Norman Pattiz, founder and chairman of mass-media company Westwood One, was the driving force behind the launch of Radio Sawa in 2002, a USAGM-administered Arabic-language radio network which broadcasts a mix of music and news.  Pattiz served as a board member of the then BBG, currently the U.S. Agency for Global Media (USAGM), the U.S. independent federal agency that oversees all foreign non-military radio and TV broadcasts.

The idea to launch Alhurra in 2004 stemmed from the success of Radio Sawa in reaching young audiences in the Middle East.  Pattiz believed that Arab audiences’ views of the United States were being negatively influenced by existing Arab news networks’ focus on coverage of the wars in Iraq, Afghanistan, and the Israeli–Palestinian conflict. He envisioned that by presenting a wider range of perspectives on these conflicts and other U.S. policies, as well as coverage of a broader variety of regional and global issues of interest to Arab audiences, a U.S.-funded satellite TV channel could help improve America's image in the region.  In pursuit of Pattiz's vision, the Bush administration requested appropriations for the channel from Congress, and obtained $62 million in funding for the channel's first year of operation (including start-up costs). In the fall of 2003, construction began to renovate an existing TV station in Springfield, VA into a modern broadcast facility for the new channel. Construction was completed less than six months later, and Alhurra's first broadcast aired February 14, 2004.

Programming 

In the restructuring and relaunch of Alhurra TV, the station has increased its newscasts from 4 to 12 hours each day delivered by an all-new lineup of news anchors and news programs, and incorporated live broadcasts from new studios near Washington D.C. and Dubai. Alhurra also has introduced news segments on issues related to North Africa and taking a deeper dive into news stories from the U.S.  New programs include “Debatable,” a weekly show presented by Ibrahim Issa, that discusses in depth critical analysis of political Islam; “Word of Truth,” a weekly show presented by Joumana Haddad, that provides a platform for silenced intellectual voices to share ideas marginalized in Arab countries; “Free Islam,” presented by Islam al-Buhairi, exploring enlightenment values and adapting them and incorporating them into “free, moderate Islam” as part of daily life;  “Sam and Ammar,” a weekly show hosted by two liberal intellectuals who share their unfiltered and cutting edge views on current affairs and spotlight Washington's political and economic decisions that impact the MENA region; “Investigative Reports,” a weekly show that aims to conduct deep investigative reports from an all-new investigative news unit; “The Talk is Syrian,” a weekly show that examines the ongoing conflict in Syria; “Decision’s Capital,” a weekly show analyzing US foreign policy.

References 

Television companies of the United States